Pido Dida: Sabay Tayo is a 1990 Filipino romantic comedy film directed by Tony Cruz starring Rene Requiestas and Kris Aquino. The title is a reference to Fido Dido, a character that was best known for advertising the soft drink brand 7Up. The film, produced and distributed by Regal Films, premiered in the Philippines on October 2, 1990.

Plot
Pido (Rene Requiestas) and Dida (Kris Aquino) grew up together in an orphanage believing they are siblings. Soon after a family adopts both of them, they leave the house due to abuse. They later reach a shanty town and found themselves living within the area with Nanay Bachoy (Vangie Labalan). During this time, their real families are already looking for them. The moment that their parents found them and they discover that they are not related, their feelings for each other get stronger. They are now separated from each other, however, with Pido working as a street vendor and Dida living in a mansion. Despite their differences, they still choose to love each other and they get married in the end. At one point in the film, Fido, in an attempt to follow Dida literally followed the plane that (he thought) Dida was aboard until he later fell down from the sky unharmed.

Cast

Main cast
 Rene Requiestas as Pido
 Kris Aquino as Dida

Supporting cast

Production
The names of the characters "Pido" and "Dida" were derived by 7 Up's cartoon character Fido Dido.

Pido Dida: Sabay Tayo was the first film of Kris Aquino, who played the character Dida. During this time, she was only 19 years old and her mother, Corazon Aquino, was then President of the Philippines. Besides her being young, her mother particularly disliked her in a comedy film. Despite her mother being against Aquino entering the entertainment business, she still pursued it.

The first leading man for Aquino, Rene Requiestas, was hand-picked during the time that he was one of the top actors in the Philippines. Due to his comic timing and mannerisms, he was already breaking box-office records in the films he starred in.

Promotion
One time while the film was being promoted in GMA Supershow, Aquino fell off the stage. Although the cameraman changed his focus right away towards the host of the show, German Moreno, who apologized, the fall became a trending topic. Aquino's image even appeared in news headlines.

Reception

Box office
The film received considerable success in the box office. The film's box office performance earned both Requiestas and Aquino the titles "Box Office King and Queen" by the Guillermo Mendoza Memorial Scholarship Foundation Citation.

As for Aquino, her first film's success and recognition paved way for more film and television opportunities. Her comic role landed her the award over other performers' dramatic roles.

Critical response
Despite its commercial success, the film received negative reviews from the critics, particularly noting that Aquino "has no talent". Cory Aquino was not happy with the critics' focus towards her daughter's acting. In response, Kris Aquino considered this film to be her starting point in her career: "I think that everyone, regardless of who or what you are, should be given the chance to fulfill his or her own dream..." In addition, the critics mentioned Aquino's superficial and glamorous life, which she rebutted as she was involved in charitable works and the like.

Sequel
Due to its box-office success, Pido Dida... Sabay Tayo was followed by two more sequel films, entitled Pido Dida 2: Kasal Na and Pido Dida 3: May Kambal Na.

Accolades

References

External links
 

1990 films
1990 romantic comedy films
Filipino-language films
Films about orphans
Philippine romantic comedy films
Regal Entertainment films
Tagalog-language films
1990s English-language films